Honeymoon suite may mean:

 Honeymoon suite (hotel)
 Honeymoon Suite, a Canadian hard rock band
 Honeymoon suite (album), a 1984 album by the band
 The Honeymoon Suite, a British rock band; see The Cape Race
 "Honeymoon Suite", a song by Lacuna Coil from the 1999 album In a Reverie